Plectrura is a genus of longhorn beetles of the subfamily Lamiinae, containing the following species:

subgenus Phlyctidola
 Plectrura metallica (Bates, 1884)

subgenus Plectrura
 Plectrura spinicauda Motschulsky, 1845

References

Parmenini